The Ukrainian Women's Futsal Championship is the top women's league of Ukrainian futsal. It was founded in 1995. It is organized by the Football Federation of Ukraine (FFU). Before, the Ukrainian teams played in the championship of the USSR. Between leagues at the end of each season, the teams exchanged - the worst drop in the lower-ranking division, their places are taken by the best team of the lower leagues. The best teams of the Premier League to play in UEFA Futsal Cup held under the auspices of the UEFA.

Ukrainian women's futsall Champions

Performance by club

See also 
 Ukrainian Men's Futsal Championship

External links 
futsalplanet.com
Belichanka-NPU Kotsiubynske

Futsal competitions in Ukraine
Top level women's futsal leagues in Europe
Women's futsal in Ukraine
Futsal
Sports leagues established in 1995
1995 establishments in Ukraine
Futsal
Professional sports leagues in Ukraine